Hemiceratoides is a genus of moths of the family Erebidae.

Species
 Hemiceratoides hieroglyphica Saalmüller, 1891
 Hemiceratoides sittaca Karsch, 1896.
 Hemiceratoides vadoni Viette 1976

References
 Hilgartner, R., Raoilison, M., Büttiker, W., Lees, D.C. & Krenn, H.W. (2007). "Malagasy birds as hosts for eye-frequenting moths." Biology Letters
 Karsch, F. (1896). Ent. Nachr. 22: 228.
 Natural History Museum Lepidoptera genus database
 Saalmüller, M. (1891). Lepidopteren von Madagascar: Neue und Wemig Bekannte Arten
 Viette, P. (1976). "Nouvelles Noctuelles de Madagascar [Lep. Noctuidae]." Bulletin Mensuel de la Société Linnéenne de Lyon 6: 220-228.

Calpinae
Moth genera